Jerzy Zelnik (born 14 September 1945) is a Polish actor. He has appeared in more than 60 films and television shows since 1963. He was awarded the Badge of Merit in Culture (1997) and Knight's Cross of the Order of Polonia Restituta (2007).

Selected filmography
 Pharaoh (1966)
 Landscape After the Battle (1970)
 The Story of Sin (1975)
 The Promised Land (1975)
 The Last Ferry (1989)
 Chopin: Desire for Love (2002)

References

External links
 

1945 births
Living people
Male actors from Kraków
Polish male film actors
Polish male television actors
Knights of the Order of Polonia Restituta
20th-century Polish male actors
21st-century Polish male actors
Recipient of the Meritorious Activist of Culture badge